This article shows a list of cities in El Salvador.

Cities
Over 100,000 or a High Human Development Index, and a high urbanization. 
AMSS = San Salvador Metropolitan Area

 Acajutla - Pop. 47,678
 Apopa - Pop. 217,733 (AMSS)
 Antiguo Cuscatlán - Highest HDI in the country (0.896-very high) Pop. 55,608 (AMSS)
 Ciudad Delgado - Pop. 174,825 (AMSS)
 Cuscatancingo - Pop. 117,013 (AMSS)
 Ilopango - Pop. 159,232 (AMSS)
 Jiquilisco - Pop. 47,784 (AMSS)
 La Unión - Pop. 26,739
 Mejicanos - Pop. 211,878 (AMSS)
 Metapán - Pop. 59,004
 San Miguel - Pop. 218,410
 San Salvador - (capital) Pop. City 540,989; Metro 2,290,000 (AMSS)
 Santa Tecla - Pop. 164,171 (AMSS)
 Santa Ana - Pop. 280,000
 San Martin - Pop. 144,722 (AMSS)
 Sonsonate - Pop. 110,501
 Soyapango - Pop. 262,975 (AMSS)

Towns
Over 50,000, medium to low urbanization, or departmental capital.

 Ahuachapán - Pop. 110,511
 Chalatenango - Pop. 29,271
 Cojutepeque - Pop. 70,000
 Nejapa - Pop. 50,966
 San Vicente - Pop. 53,213
 Tacuba - Pop. 50,000
 Usulután - Pop. 71,636
 Zacatecoluca - Pop. 62,576

Villages
Within the range of 1,001 to 49,999 or have a really low urbanization.

 Alegria - Pop. 15,000
 Arambala - Pop. 1,821 
 Apaneca - Pop. 8,597
 Berlín - Pop. 15,000
 Chirilagua - Pop. 24,000
 Comasagua - Pop. 11,870 
 Conchagua - Pop. 37,362
 Concepción de Ataco - Pop. 18,101
 Juayúa - Pop. 24,465
 Jujutla - Pop. 39,596
 La Palma, Chalatenango - Pop. 24,000
 Nahuizalco - Pop. 49,081
 Santa Rosa de Lima - Pop. 27,693 
 Suchitoto - Pop. 24,786

See also

 Municipalities of El Salvador
 List of Salvadoran departmental capitals
 Geography of El Salvador
 Salvadoran Departments by HDI

References

External links

 
El Salvador, List of cities in
El Salvador geography-related lists
El Salvador